Fernando Javier Saucedo Pereyra (born March 15, 1990 in Santa Cruz de la Sierra) is a Bolivian football midfielder who currently plays for Always Ready.

Club career
He began developing his football skills at age thirteen. In 2001, Saucedo began his professional career with hometown club Oriente Petrolero Academy after being spotted by Víctor Hugo Antelo, the team manager at that time. At the beginning of 2005 he started playing for Oriente B where he showed good football skill. In 2010, he was called by Gustavo Quinteros to join the first squad. He made his debut against Club Aurora in The Torneo Apertura; his first goal came in a match against Real Mamoré at the 80th minute.

International career
Saucedo made his international debut for Bolivia in 30 March 2016 against Argentina during the 2018 FIFA World Cup qualification.

Career statistics

Club

International
As of match played 2 September 2021. Bolivia score listed first, score column indicates score after each Saucedo goal.

References

External links 
 
Fernando Saucedo profile Boliviagol 
Fernando Saucedo goals LFPB 

1990 births
Living people
Sportspeople from Santa Cruz de la Sierra
Bolivian footballers
Oriente Petrolero players
Guabirá players
C.D. Jorge Wilstermann players
Association football midfielders
2019 Copa América players
Bolivia international footballers